ORP Heweliusz is a survey ship of the Polish Navy of the Projekt 874 class, known as modified Finik class in NATO code. She was launched on 11 September 1981 and commissioned on 27 November 1982.

The sister ship of ORP Arctowski is named after the  astronomer Johannes Hevelius.

See also
MS Jan Heweliusz

References

Auxiliary ships of Poland
1981 ships
Survey ships of the Polish Navy